Erevonu Tuicaumatalevu "Tui" Kamikamica (born 18 May 1994) is a Fijian professional rugby league footballer who plays as a  for the Melbourne Storm in the National Rugby League (NRL) and Fiji at international level.

Early life
Kamikamica was born in Taveuni, Fiji. He was raised in the village of Somosomo on the Fijian island of Taveuni, and played rugby union and was educated at Queen Victoria School, Nasinu in his youth.

He was scouted by the Parramatta Eels while playing for the Fijian Schoolboys rugby union team in late 2012.

Playing career
Kamikamica moved to Australia to play rugby league for the Eels' NYC team in 2013 and 2014. In 2015, he played for the Wentworthville Magpies, a feeder team to the Eels, in the New South Wales Cup before signing to play rugby union with the Canberra Vikings in the National Rugby Championship later that year.

2016
In 2016, Kamikamica returned to rugby league with the Sunshine Coast Falcons, a feeder team to the Melbourne Storm, in the Queensland Cup. He made his international debut for Fiji in their match against Papua New Guinea on 7 May. On 27 May, Kamikamica earned a full-time contract with the Storm, lasting until the end of 2018. He spent the remainder of the year playing for the Falcons, and was selected to represent Fiji in their match against Samoa on 8 October.

2017
In 2017, Kamikamica made his NRL debut for the Melbourne Storm in their round 5 match against the Penrith. On 6 May, he represented Fiji in their match against Tonga. Kamikamica played two games for Melbourne throughout the season, spending much of the year with the Sunshine Coast Falcons. On 7 October, Kamikamica was named in Fiji's 24-man squad for the 2017 Rugby League World Cup.

2018
Kamikamica managed only five appearances for Melbourne in the 2018 NRL season.  He did not feature in the club's finals series or the 2018 NRL Grand Final where the club lost 21-6 against the Sydney Roosters.

2019
He played 21 games for Melbourne in the 2019 NRL season as the club finished as runaway Minor Premiers and were favourites to take out the premiership.  He played in the club's preliminary final loss against the Sydney Roosters.

2020
Kamikamica only made five appearances for Melbourne in the 2020 NRL season.  He did not feature in the club's finals campaign or their 2020 NRL Grand Final victory over Penrith.

2021
He played a total of 22 games for Melbourne in the 2021 NRL season as they claimed the Minor Premiership.  He played in both finals matches including the preliminary final where Melbourne suffered a shock 10-6 loss against eventual premiers Penrith.

2022
Kamikamica played for Fiji in the 2022 Pacific Test against PNG at Campbelltown Stadium, his first international appearance since 2019.

Personal life
Kamikamica is a first cousin of fellow Fijian representative Pio Seci.

On 25 November 2021, Kamikamica was stood down by the Melbourne club after being charged with assaulting a woman in Brisbane's Fortitude Valley.  He was ordered to appear in court on January 10, 2022. On April 27, 2022 the charges against Kamikamica were dropped and he was cleared to continue playing under the NRL’s no fault stand-down policy.

References

External links
Melbourne Storm profile
2017 RLWC profile
Fiji profile

1994 births
Living people
Fijian rugby league players
Fiji national rugby league team players
Melbourne Storm players
Sunshine Coast Falcons players
Rugby league props
Wentworthville Magpies players